Integrated Lights-Out, or  iLO, is a proprietary embedded server management technology by Hewlett-Packard Enterprise which provides out-of-band management facilities. The physical connection is an Ethernet port that can be found on most ProLiant servers and microservers of the 300 and above series.

iLO has similar functionality to the lights out management (LOM) technology offered by other vendors, for example, Sun/Oracle's LOM port, Dell DRAC, the IBM Remote Supervisor Adapter and Cisco CIMC.

Features 
iLO makes it possible to perform activities on an HP server from a remote location.  The iLO card has a separate network connection (and its own IP address) to which one can connect via HTTPS.  Possible options are:
 Reset the server (in case the server doesn't respond anymore via the network card)
 Power-up the server (possible to do this from a remote location, even if the server is shut down)
 Remote system console (in some cases however an 'Advanced license' may be required for some of the utilities to work)
 Mount remote physical CD/DVD drive or image (virtual media), depends on license.
 Access the server's Integrated Management Log (IML)
 Can be manipulated remotely through XML-based Remote Insight Board Command Language (RIBCL)
 Full command-line interface support through RS-232 port (shared with system), though the inability to enter function keys prevents certain operations
 SSH remote network access to iLO card supporting public key authentication, 1024 bit DSA key, at least since iLO 3
 iLO Federation
 Two factor authentication
 Remote syslog, depends on license.

iLO provides some other utilities virtual power and a remote console.  iLO is either embedded on the system board, or available as a PCI card.

Availability 
iLO is embedded or available on some HP ProLiant and Integrity servers.

Prior to iLO, Compaq created several other lights out management products.  The original was the Remote Insight Board (RIB), which was available as an EISA or PCI expansion card.  RIB was replaced with RILOE (Remote Insight Light-Out Edition), which was only available for PCI.  The original RILOE was replaced with RILOE II.  HP stopped manufacturing RILOE II in 2006.  The final firmware version for RILOE is 2.53(A) dated 9 Mar 2004 and for RILOE II is 1.21 dated 5 July 2006.

For some older ProLiant 100 series servers there is a "Lights Out 100" option, which has more limited functionality. The LO100 is a traditional IPMI BMC, and does not share hardware or firmware with iLO. Newer ProLiant 100 series servers have a standard iLO.

There is also a version of iLO for HP Moonshot systems referred to as iLO Chassis Management which is often abbreviated as iLO CM. The Chassis Management version of iLO was derived from iLO 4. As of June 2018 the most recent Chassis Manager Firmware available is version 1.56 which was released as part of the Moonshot Component Pack 2018.02.0.

Although HP included iLO functionality in the ProLiant Gen8 MicroServer, they removed it from the Gen10 version. The ProLiant MicroServer Gen10+ has an iLO add-on card.

Versions 
There have been multiple generations of iLO, each generation noted by a single digit number ("iLO 2").  Some generations of iLO are segmented into different editions, based on what features are licensed. iLO includes updatable firmware, for which HP periodically releases new versions.

Programming Interfaces 
Several tools or APIs exist for interacting with HP iLO:
 Ansible: hponcfg module 
 Perl: Net::ILO
 Python: python-hpilo
 Ruby: ILOrb
 PowerShell: Scripting Tools for Windows PowerShell: iLO cmdlets

iLO 4 introduced a HTTP API to manage the functionality.

This served as the inspiration for the Redfish standard developed by the DMTF, which is implemented in iLO 5. It can be managed in an industry standard way, by all Redfish compatible tools. However, since Redfish allows the vendors to add custom functionality to their Redfish API, HPE forked the DMTF's tools and included additional functionality:

 ilorest tool <https://github.com/HewlettPackard/python-redfish-utility>
 Redfish Python library <https://github.com/HewlettPackard/python-ilorest-library>

Security issues 
In December 2021 Iranian researchers at Amnpardaz security firm have discovered rootkits in HPs iLO (Integrated Lights-Out) management modules.

See also 
 Intel Active Management Technology (iAMT)
 Intelligent Platform Management Interface (IPMI)
 List of Hewlett-Packard products
 Out-of-band management

References 

 Remote management, Integrated Lights-Out products at hp.com

External links 
 HPE iLO
 FreeBSD/i386 Tools for ProLiant

System administration
Integrated Lights-Out
Out-of-band management